Rear Admiral Paul Viljoen is a retired South African Navy officer, who served as Chief of Naval Operations before his retirement.

Then Commodore Viljoen was appointed Flag Officer Commanding NAVCOM East in December 1989 and promoted to rear admiral. He was appointed Chief of Naval Operations after NAVCOM East was dis-established.

He retired on 31 December 1992.

References

South African admirals
Year of birth missing (living people)
Living people